A Kulavruttanta or a Kul-vrttant (IAST: Kula-vr̥ttānta), is a genealogical almanac and biographical dictionary, a format of genealogical record keeping predominantly found in the Indian state of Maharashtra.

History 

Kulavruttantas are categorically published by family name, or surname, and are usually in Marathi. They usually document various aspects of that particular family's history, heraldry, the etymology of their name, ancestral land holdings, migration maps, and religious traditions. The genealogical charts are usually sectioned based on each gharana, or branch, of the family; these are then followed by biographies of individuals within those gharanas; and followed finally by indices of births, deaths and marriages within the family.

Kulavruttantas have been historically attributed to the genealogical history of Chitpavan brahmins. The Bhat family, during their rule of the Maratha confederacy, are usually credited for commissioning surveys and censuses of Chitpavan brahmin households, recorded on paper or cloth scrolls. These scrolls are generally used as the references of the historical and genealogical data for the compilation of these almanacs. Beginning with the publication of the Kulavruttanta of the Apte family in 1915, throughout most of the 20th century, several other Chitpavan families have gone on to commission or publish their own versions. Historian and biographer Sadashiv Ranade has notably authored several of these. 

In the 21st century, Kulavruttants have also been adopted by several other communities as a means of documenting their genealogical data, most notably the Maratha community.

See also 
 List of biographical dictionaries
 Hindu genealogy registers at Haridwar
 Almanach de Gotha
 Burke's Landed Gentry
 Debrett's Peerage & Baronetage
 Social Register
 Carnet Mondain
 Libro d'Oro

References

External links 
 at WorldCat

Family history
Genealogy publications
Literature on heraldry
Series of books
Books about social history
History books about India
History books about ethnic groups
Books about families